The 2020 F4 Japanese Championship season was the sixth season of the F4 Japanese Championship. It was competed with 12 races over four triple-header rounds.

Teams and drivers
All teams were Japanese-registered

Race calendar and results
All rounds were held in Japan and supported the Super GT events.  On 18 March 2020, the original opening round at Okayama International Circuit was postponed to an undetermined date due to the 2019-20 coronavirus pandemic.  On 30 March 2020 it was determined the second and third rounds also had to be postponed.  On 5 April 2020 the Super GT Series issued a revised calendar in which the F4 Japanese Championship also confirmed their schedule change, with a newly revised calendar being issued on 17 July 2020.

Championship standings 
Points were awarded as follows:

Drivers' standings 

‡ – Half points were awarded for race 2, as less than 75% of the scheduled distance was completed.

Independent Cup 

‡ – Half points were awarded for race 2, as less than 75% of the scheduled distance was completed.

Teams' standings 
Only the best finisher scored points for a team.

References

External links
  

Japanese F4 Championship seasons
Japanese
F4 Japanese Championship
Japanese Formula 4